Luxembourg is the fourth studio album by English rock band The Bluetones. It was released on 12 May 2003 on Superior Quality Recordings. It was re-issued on Cooking Vinyl on 15 May 2006. Its offspring singles were a "Fast Boy/Liquid Lips" double-A side and "Never Going Nowhere".

The title of the album refers to the song "You're No Fun Anymore", about an S&M relationship which has lost its spark. "Luxembourg" is the escape word used. "I Love The City" was also released as a download, prior to the album release.

Track listing
All tracks written by: Chesters, Devlin, Morriss, Morriss:
  "Here It Comes Again"   – 4:09
  "Fast Boy" – 2:57
  "Liquid Lips" – 3:02
  "You're No Fun Anymore" – 2:57
  "Big Problem" – 2:55
  "I Love the City" – 2:54
  "Never Going Nowhere" – 4:13
  "Little Bear" – 3:43
  "Code Blue" – 3:47
  "Turn It Up" – 3:38

References

2003 albums
The Bluetones albums